NGC 2264 is the designation number of the New General Catalogue that identifies two astronomical objects as a single object: the Cone Nebula, and the Christmas Tree Cluster. Two other objects are within this designation but not officially included, the Snowflake Cluster, and the Fox Fur Nebula.

All of the objects are located in the Monoceros constellation and are located about 720 parsecs or 2,300 light-years from Earth. Due to its relative proximity and large size, it is extremely well studied.

NGC 2264 is sometimes referred to as the Christmas Tree Cluster and the Cone Nebula. However, the designation of NGC 2264 in the New General Catalogue refers to both objects and not the cluster alone.

Structure

NGC 2264 is the location where the Cone Nebula, the Stellar Snowflake Cluster and the Christmas Tree Cluster have formed in this emission nebula. For reference, the Stellar Snowflake Cluster is located 2,700 light years away in the constellation Monoceros. 

The Snowflake Cluster was granted its name due to its unmistakable pinwheel-like shape and its assortment of bright colors. The Christmas Tree star formation consists of young stars obscured by heavy layers of dust clouds. These dust clouds, along with hydrogen and helium are producing luminous new stars.  The combination of dense clouds and an array of colors creates a color map filled with varying wavelengths.  As seen in the photographs taken by the Spitzer Space telescope, we are able to differentiate between young red stars and older blue stars.

With varying youthful stars comes vast changes to the overall structure of the clusters and nebula. For a cluster to be considered a Snowflake, it must remain in the original location the star was formed.

When referring to this emission nebula overall, there are several aspects that contribute to the prominent configuration of a snowflake and/or Christmas tree cluster. There is a diverse arrangement of brilliant colors, and an evolving process of structure that follow star formation in a nebula.

The ratio of brown dwarfs to stars is between 1 to 2.5 and 1 to 7.5.

References

External links

 NGC 2264 @ SEDS NGC objects pages
 
 Coordinates:  06h 41m 00s, +09° 53′ 00″
 
 O Tannenbaum, O Tannenbaum! - Astronomy Sketch of the Day, 12-25-2008
 Stellar Snowflake Cluster
 Spitzer Spots Stellar Snowflake on the 'Christmas Tree Cluster'

 
2264
Monoceros (constellation)
Open clusters
Star-forming regions